Beijing Tongren Hospital (北京同仁医院) is a famous  institution which specializes in ophthalmology and otolaryngology (ear, nose and throat medicine). Its records state that it was established in 1886 by an American Methodist church.

The hospital has had to take steps, including registering its name as a trademark, in order to protect its reputation against people fraudulently using the "Tongren" title.

External links
Century-Old Beijing Hospital Famous in China People's Daily, January 21, 2000

Hospitals in Beijing
Hospitals established in 1886